MPACC may refer to:
Molecular Production and Characterisation Centre in the Department of Chemistry, University of Cambridge, England
MPAcc, Master of Professional Accounting